A seep is a moist or wet place where water, usually groundwater, reaches the earth's surface from an underground aquifer. Other types of seeps are:
 Cold seep
 Petroleum seep
 Saline seep
 Tar seep

Seep may also refer to:

Arts, entertainment, and media
 Seep (TV series), a 2018 Pakistani television drama series that aired on TVOne Global
 "Seep", an episode of 2009 horror mystery series Harper's Island

Biology
 Seep frog (Occidozyga baluensis), a species of frog in Borneo
 Seep monkeyflower (Erythranthe guttata), a species of bee-pollinated perennial flower
 Seepweed (Suaeda), a genus of plants
 Seepwillow (Baccharis salicifolia), a blooming species of shrub in the United States, Mexico, and Guatemala

People
 Aino Seep (1925–1982), Estonian opera singer and actress

Other uses
 Ford GPA, an amphibious version of the World War II Ford GPW Jeep, also called Ford Seep (Sea Jeep)
 The SEEP Network, an American non-profit organization
 South East Europe Pipeline (SEEP), a pipeline proposal by BP